The Western Tauern Alps  are a mountain range of the Central Eastern Alps.

Geography 
The range is bound by the Salzach river in the north; in the south the upper Drava and the Rienz in the Puster Valley form the border with the Southern Limestone Alps. In the west the Wipptal Valley up to the Brenner Pass and the course of the Eisack (Isarco) river separate it from the Eastern Rhaetian Alps. Administratively the Western Tauern Alps belong to the Austrian states of Tyrol, Salzburg and Carinthia and, in the southwest, to the Italian region of Trentino-Alto Adige/Südtirol.

SOIUSA classification 
According to SOIUSA (International Standardized Mountain Subdivision of the Alps) the mountain range is an Alpine section, classified in the following way:
 main part = Eastern Alps
 major sector = Central Eastern Alps
 section = Western Tauern Alps
 code = II/A-17

Subdivision 
The range is divided into four Alpine subsections: 
 Zillertal Alps - SOIUSA code: II/A-17.I,
 High Tauern - SOIUSA code: II/A-17.II,
 Villgraten Mountains ( or Deferegger Alpen) - SOIUSA code: II/A-17.III,
 Kreuzeck group - SOIUSA code: II/A-17.IV.

Notable summits

Some notable summits of the rang are:

References

Mountain ranges of Italy
Mountain ranges of the Alps
Mountain ranges of Salzburg (state)
Landforms of Trentino-Alto Adige/Südtirol
Mountain ranges of Carinthia (state)
Mountain ranges of Tyrol (state)